Yashoda Krishna is a 1975 Indian Telugu-language film, directed by C. S. Rao. Baby Sridevi and Baby Rohini acted as Bala Krishna and Ramakrishna as Lord Krishna, which also marked actress Rohini Molleti's on-screen debut as a child artiste (aged 5). Jamuna as Yashoda and S. V. Ranga Rao as Kamsa. The film was later dubbed into Kannada of the same name. The film is also remembered for the final appearance of the great actor, S. V. Rangarao (released a year posthumously), as his previous last Tamil film Sivakamiyin Selvan (1974) got released a couple of months earlier.

Plot 
The film depicts some of the events in the life of Lord Krishna. It begins with the marriage of Devaki and Vasudeva, the birth of Krishna, Krishna Leelalu and the killing of Kamsa by Krishna.

Credits

Cast 
Jamuna as Yashoda
S.V. Ranga Rao as Kamsa
Baby Rohini as Child Lord Krishna
Baby Sridevi as Young Lord Krishna
Ramakrishna as Lord Krishna
S. Varalakshmi
Gummadi as Nanda
Sridhar as Vasudeva
Krishna Kumari as Devaki
Chandra Mohan as Narada
Manju Bhargavi as dancer
Rajanala Kaleswara Rao as Indra
Arja Janardhana Rao

Soundtrack 
The music was composed by S. Rajeswara Rao.

"Anna Chamimpu Manna" (Singer: P. Susheela)
"Chakkani vaaDe bhale Takkari vaaDe" (Singer: Ghantasala)
"Kalayo Vaishanava Mayayo" (Singer: P. Susheela)
"Kalyaana Vaibhogame Ilalo Kannula Vaikuntamu" (Singers: P. Susheela, B. Vasantha)
"Manasu Doche Doravu Neeve" (Singers: P. Susheela and Vijayalaxmi Sharma)
"Nallani Vaadu Padma Nayanammula Vaadu" (Singers: P. Susheela, B. Vasantha)
"Nela Moodu Vaanalu Nilichi Kuriseyi" (Singers: V. Ramakrishna, B. Vasantha)
"Nomu Pandindi Maa Nomu Pandindi" (Singer: P. Susheela)
"Oogindi Nalo Ananda Dola" (Singers: P. Susheela, B. Vasantha)
"Paaliya Vachina Padathi Pootana" (Singers: Madhavapeddi Satyam and P. Susheela)
"Ponnalu Virise Velalo Vennela Kuruse Relalo" (Singers: B. Vasantha and Vijayalaxmi Sharma)
"Sarasarammulu Gadiche" - P. Susheela
"Srungara Vathulara Siggela" (Singer: P. Susheela)

Reception 
Reviewing the Tamil-dubbed version, Kousikan of Kalki appreciated the photography, colour and music.

References

External links 

1970s Telugu-language films
1975 films
Hindu mythological films
Films based on the Bhagavata Purana